Pandavapuram is a 1986 Indian Malayalam-language film, directed and produced by G. S. Panicker. The film stars James, Appu, Jameela Malik and Master Deepak.

Cast
James as Kunjukuttan
Appu
Jameela Malik as Devi Teacher
Master Deepak as Raghu Nair
Murali Menon as Jaaran

References

External links
 

1986 films
1980s Malayalam-language films